Justice McConnell may refer to:

Newton W. McConnell (1832–1915), chief justice of the Montana Supreme Court
William B. McConnell (1849–1931), associate justice of the South Dakota Territorial Supreme Court